The 8th New York Infantry Regiment was an infantry regiment that served in the Union Army during the American Civil War. It was also known as the First German Rifles or Blenker's Rifles.

Service

The regiment was organized in New York City and was mustered in for a two-year enlistment on April 23, 1861.

The regiment was mustered out of service on April 23, 1863.  Men who chose to re-enlist were assigned to the 68th New York Volunteer Infantry Regiment.

Casualties
The regiment suffered 369 fatalities.

Commanders
Colonel Louis Blenker
Colonel Julius Stahel
Colonel Francis Wutschell
Colonel Felix Salm-Salm

See also
8th Regiment New York State Militia Infantry - served as the "8th New York Volunteer Infantry Regiment" during the Spanish–American War
List of New York Civil War regiments

References

External links
New York State Military Museum and Veterans Research Center - Civil War - 8th Infantry Regiment History, photograph, table of battles and casualties, Civil War newspaper clippings, and historical sketch, for the 8th New York Infantry Regiment.

Infantry 008
1861 establishments in New York (state)
Military units and formations established in 1861
Military units and formations disestablished in 1863